Bildad Peak is a conspicuous snow-capped peak  west of Spouter Peak on the south side of Flask Glacier in eastern Voden Heights, on Oscar II Coast in Graham Land. It was surveyed by the Falkland Islands Dependencies Survey in 1955, and named by the UK Antarctic Place-Names Committee after the fictional Captain Bildad, part-owner of the whaling ship Pequod in Herman Melville's Moby-Dick.

References 

Mountains of Graham Land
Oscar II Coast